Manhattan–Ogden USD 383 is a public unified school district headquartered in Manhattan, Kansas, United States.  The district includes the communities of Manhattan, Ogden, Swamp Angel, and nearby rural areas.

Schools
The school district operates the following schools:

 High school
 Manhattan High School (East and West)

 Middle schools
 Susan B. Anthony Middle School
 Dwight D. Eisenhower Middle School
        
 Elementary Schools
 Amanda Arnold Elementary School
 Frank V. Bergman Elementary School
 Bluemont Elementary School
 Lee Elementary School
 Marlatt Elementary School
 Northview Elementary School
 Ogden Elementary School
 Oliver Brown Elementary School 
 Theodore Roosevelt Elementary School
 Woodrow Wilson Elementary School

District Sites
 Robinson Education Center 
 Keith Noll Maintenance Center 
 Transportation and Central Kitchen

History
Marvin Wade, previously of the Marshalltown Community School District in Iowa, became the superintendent of Manhattan-Ogden schools in 2016. The school board extended his contract in 2018, with all members agreeing to do so.

As of October 2021, middle schools and 4 elementary schools have finished priority 1 items from 2018 bond projects including the Completion of Oliver Brown Elementary School.

In 2020, the Board of Education decided to go through 2020 with a hybrid learning plan.

See also
 Kansas State Department of Education
 Kansas State High School Activities Association
 List of high schools in Kansas
 List of unified school districts in Kansas

References

External links
 
 
 

School districts in Kansas
Manhattan, Kansas
Education in Riley County, Kansas